Răduțești may refer to several villages in Romania:

 Răduțești, a village in Ciomăgești Commune, Argeș County
 Răduțești, a village in Butoiești Commune, Mehedinți County

See also 
 Radu (given name)
 Radu (surname)
 Rădulescu (surname)
 Răducan (surname)
 Răducanu (surname)
 Rădeni (disambiguation)
 Rădești (disambiguation)
 Rădulești (disambiguation)